Barry Hughes (31 December 1937 – 2 June 2019) was a Welsh professional football player and manager, active primarily in the Netherlands. He played as a defender.

Early and personal life
Hughes was born in Caernarfon. He attended Glyndwr Secondary Modern school. In 1965 he married Elles Berger, a Dutch TV personality. The couple had three daughters and six grandchildren.

Playing career
Hughes began his career with the youth team of English team West Bromwich Albion, but left after six years, without making a first-team appearance in the Football League. He played in the Netherlands for Blauw-Wit, from 1960 to 1963, and for Alkmaar'54 from 1963 to 1965. He was captain of Alkmaar.

Coaching career
After retiring as a player, Hughes began his coaching career in 1965 with Alkmaar'54. He later managed a variety of Dutch club sides including HFC Haarlem, Go Ahead Eagles, Sparta Rotterdam, FC Utrecht, MVV and FC Volendam. While managing Haarlem in 1978, Hughes signed young player Ruud Gullit to his first ever professional football contract.

He also managed Belgian club Beerschot.

Music career
Hughes released a 7" music single in 1978 called "Voetbal is Koning" (Football is king).

In 1981, he released another single together with "De Kwaffeurs". The song is called "Ik wil op mijn kop een kamerbreed tapijt" ("I want on my head a wall to wall carpet"), a carnival song referencing his baldness. It was in the Dutch top 40 for eight weeks, where it reached place 7 between week 7 and 8 in 1981.

Death
Hughes died in Amsterdam on 2 June 2019, aged 81.

References

1937 births
2019 deaths
People from Caernarfon
Sportspeople from Gwynedd
Welsh footballers
Association football defenders
West Bromwich Albion F.C. players
Blauw-Wit Amsterdam players
AZ Alkmaar players
Welsh football managers
AZ Alkmaar managers
HFC Haarlem managers
Go Ahead Eagles managers
Sparta Rotterdam managers
FC Utrecht managers
MVV Maastricht managers
FC Volendam managers
Beerschot A.C. managers
Welsh male singers
Welsh expatriate footballers
Welsh expatriate football managers
Welsh expatriate sportspeople in the Netherlands
Expatriate footballers in the Netherlands
Expatriate football managers in the Netherlands
Welsh expatriate sportspeople in Belgium
Expatriate football managers in Belgium